MacArthur station is a Bay Area Rapid Transit (BART) station in the Temescal District of Oakland, California. It is the largest station in the BART system, being the only one with four platform tracks. Service through MacArthur is timed for cross-platform transfers between the southbound lines that pass through the station. MacArthur station is located in the median of SR 24 just north of its interchange with I-580. The station is perpendicular to 40th Street and MacArthur Boulevard. The surrounding neighborhood is mostly low-density residential, making MacArthur station primarily a commuting hub.

History 

MacArthur station opened on September 11, 1972, as the northern terminus of the inaugural BART line, which ran to Fremont. Upon the opening of the Transbay Tube in 1974, the station began to serve Transbay trains to San Francisco. The station included several pieces of public art: an abstract mural by Mark Adams over a staircase (which Adams later replaced with two murals after the stairs were removed for an elevator in 2000), and tile mosaics by Adams and Alfonso Pardiñas in the fare lobby.

On July 22, 2018, a man fatally stabbed Nia Wilson at the station. Sunday-only service to the station on the Dublin/Pleasanton line was operated from February 11, 2019 to February 10, 2020.

MacArthur Transit Village 
Because of MacArthur's importance as an interchange and its location in the center of the East Bay, BART has conducted a number of feasibility studies about the prospects of creating transit-oriented development around the station. These studies have resulted in a plan for the "MacArthur Transit Village," a mixed-use development on the eastern side of Route 24 bounded by 40th Street, Telegraph Avenue, and West MacArthur Boulevard. MacArthur Commons occupies Parcel A and Parcel C of the Village, providing 385 apartment units. The groundbreaking for the project was held in May 2011 with the start of construction for a new 450-space parking garage for BART. BART opened a parking garage as part of the project in September 2014.

Station layout 

MacArthur station has two island platforms and four tracks, allowing cross-platform interchanges between lines. Connections between the lines are timed for southbound passengers, while  is the transfer point for northbound service. MacArthur tends to be crowded in the morning due to high transfer volume between two lines where only a few people get off while many are trying to board. Southbound trains converge to single track towards downtown Oakland; San Francisco-bound trains depart before Berryessa-bound trains.

Bus connections 
MacArthur station is served by several AC Transit routes: local route 57 on 40th Street, local route 18 on Martin Luther King Jr. Way to the west, and local route 6 and All-nighter route 800 on Telegraph Avenue to the east. Several shuttle routes stop on Walter Miles Way on the east side of the station entrance. These include Early Bird Express route 705, Emery-Go-Round buses serving Emeryville, the Caltrans Bay Bridge Bike Shuttle, three Kaiser Shuttle routes, and four Alta Bates shuttle routes.

References

External links 

BART – MacArthur

Bay Area Rapid Transit stations in Alameda County, California
Stations on the Orange Line (BART)
Stations on the Yellow Line (BART)
Stations on the Red Line (BART)
Railway stations in Oakland, California
Railway stations in the United States opened in 1972